Austin S. Post (16 March 1922 – 12 November 2012) was a photographer, glaciologist, and mountaineer known for his aerial photography of the mountains and glaciers of North America, particularly the North Cascades of Washington and Glacier Bay, Alaska.

Post worked for many years as a research scientist for the United States Geological Survey and was awarded an honorary degree from the University of Alaska-Fairbanks in 2004, despite not having graduated from high school. Many of his photographs were used in the Cascade Alpine Guide series by Fred Beckey. Post named Bradford Washburn as a photographic influence. He lived on Vashon Island, Washington.

Selected publications

Selected ascents
 First ascent of the Southeast Ridge of the White Princess, Eastern Alaska Range, 1950, Austin Post, Gottfried Ehrenburg, Don MacAskill, Lawrence E. Nielsen

References

External links

 Austin Post at the USGS Publications Warehouse
 Austin Post at the USGS Photographic Library

American glaciologists
United States Geological Survey personnel
American photographers
Nature photographers
Aerial photographers
American mountain climbers
North Cascades of Washington (state)
People from Vashon, Washington
1922 births
2012 deaths